Sir Peter James Mason KBE was Chairman of Thames Water and senior non-executive director of BAE Systems plc.

He was previously Chief Executive of AMEC. He has also held senior positions at Balfour Beatty, BICC and Norwest Holst. He is currently chairman of Kemble Water Holdings Ltd.

References

BAE Systems people
Thames Water
Living people
British businesspeople
Knights Commander of the Order of the British Empire 
Year of birth missing (living people)